Meridian is an unincorporated community and a census-designated place (CDP) located in and governed by Douglas County, Colorado, United States. The CDP is a part of the Denver–Aurora–Lakewood, CO Metropolitan Statistical Area. The population of the Meridian CDP was 2,970 at the United States Census 2010. The CDP lies in ZIP code 80112.

Geography
The Meridian CDP is located in northern Douglas County at 39.53’89”N 104.84’75”W at 5,964 feet above sea level, higher than Denver. Meridian roughly spans from the intersection of I-25 and Inverness Parkway south to the intersection of I-25 and Lincoln Avenue, east along Lincoln Avenue to North 1st Street, north along North 1st Street until E-470 where the boundary then meanders northeast until South Chambers Road, where it finally spans due west back to the intersection of I-25 and Inverness Parkway. The plot of developed land just south of Lincoln Avenue is included in the CDP as well. According to the United States Census Bureau, the CDP has a total area of 2.56 square miles, all of which is land. It is bordered to the north by Centennial, to the west and south by Lone Tree, and to the east by Parker; Denver is 18 miles to the north. The natural geography of Meridian can be characterized by slow, rolling hills covered in thick grass and brush.

Demographics

Education
The Douglas County School District serves Meridian.

Economy
The Meridian International Business Center, from which the CDP derives its name, hosts the headquarters of three Fortune 500 Companies, including; Dish Network, Liberty Media, and Qurate Retail.  Other notable employers within Meridian include; Toyota, American Family Insurance, Sierra Nevada, Jacobs, and Toastmasters.

See also

Outline of Colorado
Index of Colorado-related articles
State of Colorado
Colorado cities and towns
Colorado census designated places
Colorado counties
Douglas County, Colorado
List of statistical areas in Colorado
Front Range Urban Corridor
North Central Colorado Urban Area
Denver-Aurora-Boulder, CO Combined Statistical Area
Denver-Aurora-Broomfield, CO Metropolitan Statistical Area

References

External links

Meridian Golf Club
Douglas County website
Douglas County School District

Census-designated places in Douglas County, Colorado
Census-designated places in Colorado
Denver metropolitan area